Dimitris Gourtsas (born 27 October 1990) is a Greek footballer who plays as a forward for Panserraikos.

Career
Gourtsas made his first football steps just in the age of 12 in his local town team Visaltiakos Nigrita.
At the age of 17 he signed for Panserraikos his first professional contract. In the season 2008/09 he had appearances both in the U-21 team of the club and also in the first squad under coach Giannis Papakostas. On 21 August 2013 he signed a three years contract with AEL where he had his most successful and productive season so far, having scored 17 goals in 26 games in the Greek Football League 2 championship.

On 2 January 2017, he returned to Panserraikos, following his release from Aiginiakos. He finished the 2016–17 season making 30 appearances, scoring 9 goals and giving 4 assists. He started the 2017–18 season as the undisputed leader of the club.

External links
 AEL FC Official
 My Player Profile (Greek)
 Mikres Katigories Interview (Greek)
 OnSports (Greek)
 Panserraikos - AEL 1-0 2009 (YouTube Video) 
 Ethnikos Filippiada - AEL 0-1 2013 (Youtube Video)

1990 births
Living people
Greek footballers
Panachaiki F.C. players
Panserraikos F.C. players
Athlitiki Enosi Larissa F.C. players
Association football forwards
People from Nigrita
Footballers from Central Macedonia